Solanum huaylasense is a species of plant (wild tomato) in the family Solanaceae. It is endemic to Peru.

Description
Its leaves are interrupted imparipinnate, bright green, minutely pubescent with stiff simple uniseriate trichomes like those of the stems.

Seeds are obovate, narrowly winged at the apex and acute at the base, pale brown, pubescent with hair-like outgrowths of the integument cell radial walls, which give the surface a silky appearance. Chromosome number: n=12 .

Distribution

References

Further reading

huaylasense
Endemic flora of Peru